National Route 402 is a national highway of Japan connecting Kashiwazaki, Niigata and Chūō-ku, Niigata in Japan, with a total length of 89 km (55.3 mi).

References

National highways in Japan
Roads in Niigata Prefecture